James Pleasants Massie III (May 3, 1958 – January 25, 2023) was an American politician of the Republican Party. From 2008 to 2018, he was a member of the Virginia House of Delegates. He represented the 72nd district in Henrico County.

References

External links
Jimmie Massie; Working for Henrico (constituent/campaign website)

1958 births
Living people
Republican Party members of the Virginia House of Delegates
University of Virginia alumni
People from Henrico County, Virginia
21st-century American politicians